The John A. Roebling Suspension Bridge (formerly the Cincinnati-Covington Bridge) is a suspension bridge that spans the Ohio River between Cincinnati, Ohio, and Covington, Kentucky. Pedestrians use the bridge to get between the hotels, bars, restaurants, and parking lots in Northern Kentucky. The bar and restaurant district at the foot of the bridge on the Kentucky side is known as Roebling Point.

Ramps were constructed leading directly from the bridge to the Dixie Terminal building used for streetcars. These provided Covington–Cincinnati streetcars "with a grade-separated route to the center of downtown, and the terminal building was originally intended to connect, via underground pedestrian passages, with the never-built Fountain Square Station of the infamous Cincinnati Subway." When streetcar service ceased in the 1950s, the terminal was converted to a diesel bus terminal. The ramps were removed in 1998 when it ceased being used as a bus terminal.

Planning and charter

In the mid-19th century, need of a passage over the Ohio River became apparent. Commerce between Ohio and Kentucky had increased to the point that the highly congested steamboat traffic was constricting the economy. A solution that would not constrict traffic on the river even further was a wire cable suspension bridge of the type developed by French engineers. Several American engineers had begun designing and building suspension bridges. One of these men was John A. Roebling of Saxonburg, Pennsylvania. The Ohio River, however, was much wider than any river that had been bridged in France.

The Covington and Cincinnati Bridge Company was incorporated in February 1846, and the company asked Roebling to plan a bridge. Steamboat and ferry interest groups lobbied against this plan. They feared an obstructed waterway, loss of a ferry market, and depreciation of property. The Ohio legislature refused the charter of the bridge. In September, Roebling published a 36-page report containing a technical discussion and an analysis of said problems. He attacked steamboat operators for using oversized chimneys, speculated on future commercial interests, and surmised on the importance of spanning western rivers. Roebling also specified that the company should make the decision as to the placement of the bridge along the river. Still, no charter was granted.

After observing the construction of a suspension bridge upriver, in Wheeling, Virginia (later West Virginia), the legislature relented and passed the charter, mandating excessive dimensions such as a  main span and requesting that the legislature determine the bridge location. This latter provision would later be regretted by everyone involved. The roads of Cincinnati and Covington were laid collinear with each other, in the hope that a bridge would be built sometime in the future. When the Ohio legislature decided to choose its own location for the bridge, it failed to pick such an obvious spot, hoping to defend Cincinnati's preeminence over Newport and Covington, the rival Kentucky cities. The bridge was actually located almost entirely in Kentucky because the state boundary follows the north bank of the river. It deprived Cincinnati forever of one of "the finest and most magnificent avenues on this continent."

In 1854, a small suspension bridge over the Licking River at Newport, Kentucky, collapsed. This event deterred investors, and the bridge company could not raise enough money to start construction. Amos Shinkle was elected to the board of trustees in 1856. He brought with him a much needed boost of energy. Shinkle immediately managed to find new private investors and to procure more support from both the Ohio and Kentucky governments. By now, Roebling had established a reputation. President Ramson of the bridge company traveled to see Roebling, who was in Iowa, and he secured a contract to build the bridge. In September, Roebling arrived in Cincinnati, and much to his disgust, nothing was prepared.

Construction
Excavation for the foundation of the Covington tower commenced in September 1856 and went smoothly. A foundation was set consisting of 13 layers of oak beams, each layer set perpendicular to the one beneath it, bolted with iron hardware, and finally all cemented into place. On the Cincinnati side, work was delayed from the start. The construction crews could not pump water out of the excavating pit fast enough. After months of little progress, Roebling decided against buying costly machinery or bigger engines for his pumps and, quite last minute, designed his own square positive displacement pumps from three-inch (76 mm) pine planks. He built them locally in about forty-eight hours and ran them off of one of Amos Shinkles' tugboats, the Champion No.1. The homemade pumps displaced forty gallons of mud and clay in each cycle.

When the crews reached the compacted gravel bed of the Ohio River, Roebling decided this would be sufficient for the foundation of the Cincinnati tower. Oak timbers were laid, mirroring the foundation of the Covington tower, and within three months, masonry on both towers reached above the waterline (which, at this time, was at a record low for the fall). Work halted for the freezing temperatures and increased water level, a practice which continued seasonally until completion of the bridge. At this time, a revised contract was drawn up, stating work was to be completed by December 1858, barring "unavoidable calamities".

After a hard winter of 1856–57, and a wet spring, construction resumed in July 1857. Sandstone was used for the first twenty five vertical feet of each tower base. Limestone encased this sandstone to protect against scour and collision from watercraft. The remaining height of each tower was to be constructed of sandstone, rough cut and with a large draft. Roebling said this gave the towers "a massive look, quite suitable to their function."

Working from July to August 1857, the company was without liquid funds, a problem compounded by the Panic of 1857. Work halted because of the inability to pay for the project. In July 1858, operations resumed again, albeit with a smaller workforce. Only one tower was worked on at a time. President Ramson of the company died, and no work was done during the years 1859–60.

In November 1860, Abraham Lincoln was elected president of the United States, and the Civil War began in January 1861. Upon a threatened siege of Cincinnati from Confederate forces, a pontoon bridge was built to span the Ohio River, allowing Union troops to cross and construct defenses. Soon after, once it had become obvious that a permanent structure was vital, money from investors came pouring in. Bonds were sold, and in January 1863 materials began arriving. Preparations to resume construction were made. Machinery was ordered, and new derricks were built, but a renewed threat of invasion again temporarily halted progress. Finally, in the spring of 1863, work commenced and continued until the end of the year.

In the spring of 1864, work resumed again. Although Roebling operated his own wire mill at Trenton, New Jersey, the bridge company purchased one million pounds of wire from Richard Johnson at Manchester, England, for the cables that would span the width of the river. Roebling had used Johnson's wire for one of his other bridges. He preferred it over wire made in the United States because it was of better quality and greater tensile strength. Anchorages on both shores were constructed of limestone base and a freestone finish. Eleven-ton iron anchors were embedded in each block, securing cables with wrought iron chain links of Roebling's patent. The Civil War depleted the work force on the project, hindering speed and efficiency until its end.

Work on the bridge proceeded steadily after the end of the war. In September 1865 the first two wire ropes were laid. They were unwound from a spool on a barge, allowed to sink to the bottom of the river, then raised in unison from the riverbed. Wooden crossbeams were laid at regular intervals from the wire ropes, and a simple footbridge was constructed for the benefit of the workers. With the Ohio River "spanned," there was a final push to complete the project even through floods and freezing temperatures. The cabling of the bridge went at a feverish pace, with about eighty wires placed per day. Hundreds watched the spider-like process from both shores. And on June 23, 1866, the last wire was taken across, for a total of 10,360 wires. These were subsequently compressed together and wrapped with an outer covering of wire into two cables of 5,180 wires each. Two tracks for streetcars were laid. Diagonal stays were added to increase load capacity, strengthen the floor, and check vibration. Wrought iron trusses were added, running the length of the bridge.

On December 1, 1866, pedestrians walked upon the bridge, known locally only as "The Suspension Bridge," for the first time. Over 166,000 people walked across in the first two days. Final touches were put on the bridge over the next few months, and construction officially ended in July 1867. Two men died during construction. When the Roebling Bridge was formally opened on January 1, 1867, the driver of a horse and buggy was charged a toll of 15 cents to cross; the toll for three horses and a carriage was 25 cents. Pedestrians were charged one cent.

Alterations and designations

The original deck of the bridge was built at the lowest possible cost because of Civil War inflation, but the stone towers had been designed to carry a much heavier load than was originally demanded. In 1896, the bridge received a second set of main cables, a wider steel deck, and a longer northern approach. The reconstruction significantly altered the appearance of the bridge, but the new 30-ton weight limit extended its usefulness through the 20th century and beyond. In 1976, in honor of America's bicentennial, the bridge was painted blue (rather than brown).

The Covington-Cincinnati Bridge Company—a private company—operated the bridge until the Commonwealth of Kentucky purchased it in 1953 for $4.2 million.

The bridge was designated a National Historic Landmark in 1975 and was designated a National Historic Civil Engineering Landmark in 1983. It remains the busiest of Cincinnati's four non-freeway automobile or pedestrian bridges. Initially called the "Covington-Cincinnati Suspension Bridge" or "Ohio River Bridge", it was renamed in honor of its designer and builder on June 27, 1983.

The Commonwealth of Kentucky closed the bridge on November 13, 2006, to make extensive repairs to the structure. It reopened in late March. However, it closed again for much of 2008 for repainting. On September 11, 2007, the Commonwealth of Kentucky reduced the weight limit to 11 tons to prevent future structural damage following an analysis by the University of Kentucky. The lower weight limit prevents buses from crossing the bridge.

The Commonwealth of Kentucky once again closed the bridge on April 7, 2010, for a complete repainting; the bridge reopened in November 2010. The closing of the bridge only affected vehicular traffic, while one pedestrian lane remained open.

Recent closures
On January 10, 2013, a large piece of sandstone fell from the north tower causing the bridge to be closed for approximately 4 hours during rush hour. This time was used to remove debris and inspect the tower for further damage.

On March 21, 2018, the bridge was closed until April 27 after an automobile accident damaged a steel section of the bridge. On April 17, 2019, another piece of sandstone fell, prompting closure until August 9.

On November 11, 2020, the nearby Brent Spence Bridge was closed following a fiery collision. Semitrucks began using the Roebling Bridge as an alternate crossing point, in violation of the bridge's 11-ton weight limit, prompting Covington police to close the suspension bridge to all vehicular traffic so additional safeguards could be put in place. The Roebling Bridge reopened on November 13, 2020, with Covington and Cincinnati police monitoring traffic on the bridge.

On February 15, 2021, the bridge closed for a nine-month rehabilitation project; it reopened in November 2021.

See also
List of bridges documented by the Historic American Engineering Record in Kentucky
List of bridges documented by the Historic American Engineering Record in Ohio
List of crossings of the Ohio River
List of historic civil engineering landmarks
List of largest suspension bridges
List of National Historic Landmarks in Kentucky
List of National Historic Landmarks in Ohio

Notes

References

External links

 
 
 John A. Roebling Suspension Bridge at Bridges & Tunnels
 John A. Roebling Suspension Bridge at RootsWeb
 Roebling Suspension Bridge photographs by Cincinnati Images
 Roebling Suspension Bridge at Cincinnati Transit
 Roebling Suspension Bridge at Historic Bridges of Michigan and Elsewhere
 Discover Northern Kentucky: Roebling Bridge
 
 

Bridges completed in 1866
Bridges in Cincinnati
Dixie Highway
Bridges over the Ohio River
Road bridges on the National Register of Historic Places in Kentucky
Road bridges on the National Register of Historic Places in Ohio
Historic American Engineering Record in Kentucky
Historic American Engineering Record in Ohio
National Register of Historic Places in Kenton County, Kentucky
National Register of Historic Places in Cincinnati
National Historic Landmarks in Kentucky
National Historic Landmarks in Ohio
Suspension bridges in the United States
Suspension bridges in Ohio
Towers in Kentucky
Historic Civil Engineering Landmarks
Buildings and structures in Covington, Kentucky
Former toll bridges in Kentucky
Former toll bridges in Ohio
1866 establishments in Kentucky
1866 establishments in Ohio
Wrought iron bridges in the United States
Interstate vehicle bridges in the United States
Transportation in Kenton County, Kentucky